The surname Ford has several origins. In some cases it originated as a name for someone who lived near a ford, and is therefore derived from the Old English and Middle English ford. In some cases, the surname is derived from places named Ford. Examples of such places include Ford in Northumberland (from Old English ford), a place in Somerset, Ford in Shropshire (from Old English ford), Ford in West Sussex (from Old English ford), and Forde in Dorset.

In other cases, the surname is sometimes an anglicised form of three Irish surnames. Two such surnames are Mac Giolla na Naomh, a name meaning "son of Gilla na Naomh"; and Mac Conshámha, a name meaning "son of Conshnámha". These surnames were anglicised Ford because their final syllable was once erroneously thought to be the Irish áth ("ford"). Another Irish surname anglicised Ford is Ó Fuartháin, a name meaning "descendant of Fuarthán". The personal name Fuartháin, derived from the Irish fuar ("cold"), was once taken to represent the Irish fuarathán ("cold little ford"), which led the name to be erroneously translated "ford". The former two Irish surnames were borne by septs centred in the province of Connacht, whilst the latter was borne by a sept centred in County Cork (in the province of Munster).

In some cases the surname Ford is an americanized form of like-sounding Jewish surnames, or else a translated form of the German Fürth. Early instances of the surname Ford include de la forda in the eleventh century, æt Fordan in the twelfth-century, de la Forthe in the thirteenth-century, and Foorde and de Furd in the fifteenth century. The surname Ford, when found in Ireland, may be of English or Irish origin since many Ford families have immigrated to Ireland at various times in history. For example, a particular noted family of the name in County Meath emigrated from Devon in the fourteenth century. In Ireland, birth records for the year 1890 reveal that the surname Ford was much less common than the variant Forde (154 births compared to only 39).

A
Aiden Ford, a fictional character from the television show Stargate Atlantis
Alan Ford (actor) (born 1937), English actor
Alan Ford (swimmer) (1923–2008), American swimmer
Alan Ford (comics), Italian comics character
Aleksander Ford (1908–1980), Polish film director
Alphonso Ford (1971–2004), American basketball player
Andrew Ford (disambiguation), several people
Andy Ford (born 1954), English association football player and manager
Anna Ford (born 1943), British journalist and newsreader
Arthur Ford (disambiguation), several people

B
Ben Ford (politician) (born 1925), British politician
Ben Ford (baseball) (born 1975), American baseball player
Betty Ford (1918–2011), wife of former United States president Gerald Ford, and founder of the Betty Ford Center
Boris Ford (1917–1998), Indian-born British literary critic, writer, editor and educationist
Brian J. Ford (born 1939), English independent scientist
Bruce Ford (disambiguation), several people, including:
Bruce Ford (rower) (born 1954), Canadian rower
Bruce Ford (tenor) (born 1956), American operatic tenor
Byington Ford (1890–1985), American, Pebble Beach and Carmel Valley developer, aviator, son of Tirey L. Ford

C
Carole Ann Ford (born 1940), English actress
Cheryl Ford (born 1981), American basketball player
Christine Blasey Ford (born 1966), American clinical psychology professor
Christopher Ford, American screenwriter
Clare Ford (1828–1899), English diplomat
Clay Ford (1938–2013), American politician
Clint Ford (born 1976), American actor and voice-over artist
Clinton Ford (singer) (1931–2009), British singer
Clinton B. Ford (1913–1992), American investor, musician and astronomer
Cody Ford (born 1997), American football player
Colin Ford (born 1996), American actor and voice actor
Colin Ford (curator) (born 1934), British history of photography and museum director
Colt Ford (born 1969), American Hick-Hop Artist
Constance Ford (1923–1993), American actress and model
Curt Ford (born 1960), American baseball player

D
David Robert Ford (born 1935), British soldier and diplomat, former Chief Secretary of Hong Kong
David Ford (actor) (1925–1983), American actor 
David Ford (footballer) (born 1945), English footballer
David Ford (kayaker) (born 1967), Canadian whitewater slalom kayaker
David Ford (musician) (born 1978), British singer-songwriter
David Ford (politician) born 1951, former Leader of the Alliance Party of Northern Ireland, and Minister for Justice.
David F. Ford (born 1948), Anglican theologian
Dean Ford (1946–2018), stage name of Thomas McAleese, Scottish singer and songwriter, member of the band Marmalade
Debbie Ford (1955–2013), American self-help writer
Desmond Ford (born 1929), Australian Christian speaker and author
Don Ford (born 1952), American basketball player
Donald Ford (born 1944), Scottish footballer
Donald E. Ford (1921–1965), American science fiction editor
Doug Ford (born 1964), current Premier of Ontario
Doug Ford Sr. (1933–2006), Canadian politician

E
E. B. Ford (1901–1988), British ecological geneticist
Edgar Ford (1876–1943), English cricketer
Edsel Ford (1893–1943), American businessman, president of Ford Motor Company, son of Henry Ford
Eileen Ford (1922–2014), American model agency executive and co-founder of Ford Models
Elena Ford (born 1966), American director within the Ford Motor Company, great-great granddaughter of Henry Ford
Emile Ford (1937–2016), West Indian-born musician and sound engineer

F
Ford Madox Ford (1873–1939), English novelist and publisher
Francis Ford (cricketer) (1866–1940), English cricketer
Francis Ford Coppola (born 1939), American film director, producer, and screenwriter
Frankie Ford (1939–2015), American singer
Franklin Lewis Ford (1920–2003), American historian
Fred Ford (American football) (born 1938), American football halfback
Frederick W. Ford (1909–1986), American Chairman of the Federal Communications Commission

G
Gene Ford (pitcher, born 1912) (died 1970), American baseball player
Gene Ford (1881–1973), American baseball player
George Henry Ford (1808–1876), South African natural history illustrator working in Britain
G. M. Ford (born 1945), American author
Gerald J. Ford (born 1944), American banker
Gerald Ford (1913–2006), 38th president of the United States
Gerard W. Ford (1924–2008), American businessman who co-founded Ford Modeling Agency
Gina Ford (born c. 1960), British writer on parenting methods
Glenn Ford (1916–2006), Canadian-American actor
Glyn Ford (born 1950), British politician
Gordon Onslow Ford (1912–2003), British artist
G. Sarsfield Ford (1933–2013), American jurist

H
Harold Ford Sr. (born 1945), American politician
Harold Ford Jr. (born 1970), American politician
Harriet Ford (1863–1949), American actress and playwright
Harrison Ford (silent film actor) (1884–1957), American silent film actor
Harrison Ford (born 1942), American actor
Henry Ford (1863–1947), American industrialist, founder of the Ford Motor Company
 For others, see Henry Ford (disambiguation)
Holden Ford, a fictional character from psychological thriller Mindhunter
Hugh Alastair Ford (born 1946), Australian ornithologist

I
Isaiah Ford (born 1996), American football player

J
Jack Ford (journalist), American TV reporter and host
Jack Ford (politician) (1947–2015), American educator and politician
 "Jack" John Gardner Ford (born 1952), American businessman and politician, son of Gerald Ford
James Ford (pirate) (1775–1833), Kentucky criminal gang leader
James W. Ford (1893–1957), African American politician and Communist Party USA vice presidential candidate
Jeremiah D. M. Ford (1873–1958), American college professor at Harvard
Jeremy Ford (chef) (born 1985), American chef
Jerome Ford (born 1999), American football player
John Ford (disambiguation), multiple people
Jonathan Ford (disambiguation), multiple people
Jordan Ford (born 1998), American basketball player
Julian Ralph Ford (1932–1987), Australian ornithologist

K
Kate Ford (born 1977), English actress
Keith Ford (born 1994), American football player
Kira Ford, a fictional character from Power Rangers Dino Thunder.

L
Lalatina Dustiness Ford, a fictional character from the light novel and anime KonoSuba
Larry Ford (American football) (born 1988), American football player
Lester R. Ford (1886–1967), American mathematician
L. R. Ford Jr. (born 1927), American mathematician
Lita Ford (born 1958), British-born singer
Lew Ford (born 1976), American professional baseball player
Louis Ford (born 1845), English businessman, football administrator and referee
Louis Ford (footballer) (born 1914), Welsh footballer
Louise Ford, British comedian and actress

M
Malcolm Webster Ford (1862–1902), American athlete and journalist 
Mark Ford (footballer) (born 1975), English footballer 
Melbourne H. Ford (1849–1891), U.S. Representative from Michigan
Melyssa Ford (born 1976), Canadian model and actress
Michael Ford (disambiguation), several people
Mike Ford (disambiguation), several people
Mick Ford (born 1957), British actor and playwright
Monica Ford, American socialite

N
Nick Ford (born 1999), American football player

P
Paris Ford (born 1998), American football player
Patricia Ford (disambiguation), multiple people
Patrick Ford (disambiguation), multiple people
Paul Ford (1901–1976), American actor
Paul Leicester Ford (1865–1902), American novelist
Penny Ford (born 1964), American singer
Poona Ford (born 1995), American football player

R
Richard Ford (disambiguation), several people, including:
Richard Ford (born 1944), American writer
Rob Ford (1969–2016), Canadian politician 
Robben Ford (born 1951), American guitarist
Robert Ford (outlaw) (1860–1892), American outlaw who shot Jesse James
Robert Ford (Canadian diplomat) (1915–1998), Canadian poet, translator and diplomat
Robert Stephen Ford (born 1958), American diplomat
Robert Ford (politician) (born 1948), member of the South Carolina Senate
Robert W. Ford (1923–2013), British radio operator in Tibet between 1945 and 1950, author and diplomat
Rudy Ford (born 1994), American football player
Russ Ford (1883–1960), American baseball player
Russell Ford (born 1983), Australian hockey player
Ryan Ford (disambiguation), several people

S
Sallie Rochester Ford (1828–1910), American writer, newspaper editor
Seabury Ford (1801–1855), American politician 
Seth Porter Ford (1817–1866), American physician in the Kingdom of Hawaii
Simon Ford (born 1981), English footballer
Stanley H. Ford (1877-1961), United States Army General
Steven Ford (born 1956), American actor, son of Gerald Ford
Susan Ford (born 1957), American author, photojournalist, daughter of Gerald Ford

T
T. J. Ford (born 1983), NBA basketball player
Tennessee Ernie Ford (1919–1991), American recording artist and television host 
 Sir Theodore Ford (1829–1920), Chief Justice of the Straits Settlements
Thomas Mikal Ford (1962–2016), American actor
Tim Ford (1951–2015), Mississippi politician
Tirey L. Ford (1857–1928), California politician and a novelist
T-Model Ford (c. 1923–2013), American musician
Todd Ford (born 1984), Canadian ice hockey goaltender
Tom Ford (born 1961), American fashion designer
Tony Ford (footballer, born 1944), English footballer
Tony Ford (footballer, born 1959), English footballer
Trent Ford (born 1979), British American actor and model
Trevor Ford (1923–2003), Welsh footballer
Trevor D. Ford, British geologist

V 

Vicky Ford (born 1967), British politician

W
Wallace Ford (1898–1966), American actor 
Walter Burton Ford (1874–1971), American mathematician
Walton Ford (born 1960), American watercolor painter
Wayne Adam Ford (born 1961), American serial killer
Wendell H. Ford (1924–2015), American politician
Whitey Ford (1928–2020), American baseball player
Will Ford (born 1986), American football player
Willa Ford (born 1981), American singer-songwriter
William Clay Ford Jr. (born 1957), American businessman, chairman of Ford Motor Company, great-grandson of Henry Ford
William Prince Ford (1803–1866), Louisiana preacher and farmer, first enslaver of Solomon Northup
Worthington C. Ford (1858–1941), American historian, librarian at the Library of Congress and Brown University

See also
Ford (disambiguation)
Forde (surname)
Fforde

References
Notes

Sources
 This webpage contains an excerpt of 
 This webpage contains an excerpt of 
 Accessed via Open Library.
 Accessed via Open Library.
 Accessed via Open Library.

 Accessed via Open Library.

 Accessed via Open Library.

English-language surnames
English toponymic surnames
Anglicised Irish-language surnames
Jewish surnames